Joseph Douglas Skalski (born September 26, 1964) is an American former Major League Baseball pitcher. He appeared in just two games for the Cleveland Indians, pitching 6⅔ innings.  He was the losing pitcher in both of his games.

Joe attended Saint Xavier University and was drafted by the Cleveland Indians in the 3rd round of the 1986 amateur draft.  He pitched in the Indians organization until 1990.

External links

1964 births
Living people
Major League Baseball pitchers
Cleveland Indians players
Baseball players from Illinois
Saint Xavier Cougars baseball players
American people of Polish descent
People from Cook County, Illinois
Batavia Trojans players
Buffalo Bisons (minor league) players
Colorado Springs Sky Sox players
Waterloo Indians players
Williamsport Bills players